VBZ may refer to:

 Verkehrsbetriebe Zürich, the municipal transport operator of Zurich, Switzerland
 V.B.Z. d.o.o., a publishing company from Zagreb, Croatia